Ippolito Borghese (late 16th century – March 1627) was an Italian painter of the late-Renaissance, born in Sigillo (near Perugia).

His training was probably in Rome, where he became a follower of Scipione Pulzone and was influenced by the painterly traditions of Federigo Barocci. He then moved to Naples. He was influenced by the circle of Mannerist artists active in the Rome of Sixtus V. In 1598 he completed a St. George and the dragon for the Duomo of Ischia. In 1601 he signed a canvas in Carpignano Salentino. He painted a Madonna & saints (1601) for the church of Santa Maria della Grotta in Carpignano. In 1603, he painted an Assumption of the Virgin for the Chapel of the Palace of Monte di Pietà in Naples. One of his pupils was Paolo Domenico Finoglia. In 1605, he painted for the church of Santa Teresa in Studi.

He painted numerous altarpieces intended for Neapolitan churches such as Santa Maria la Nova, the Bishop's seminary, and Santi Filippo e Giacomo, as well as for churches in surrounding sites such as Lucera, Regoledo, Corigliano Calabro, Amalfi, Caiazzo, San Gregorio Armeno, Meta di Sorrento, and Atri. In 1627, he collaborated with Finoglia in a polyptych for the church of Sant'Antonio in Lauria.

References

 Deposition at The Fondazione Cassa di Risparmio di Perugia.
Short biography from il portale del Sud

Notes

16th-century births
1627 deaths
People from the Province of Perugia
16th-century Italian painters
Italian male painters
17th-century Italian painters
Painters from Naples
Italian Mannerist painters